Paula Burlamaqui is a Brazilian actress who has starred in many Rede Globo productions.

Selected filmography
Barriga de Aluguel (1990)
Pedra sobre Pedra (1992)
O Mapa da Mina (1993)
Explode Coração (1995)
O Circo das Qualidades Humanas (2000)
Uga-Uga (2000)
Sabor da Paixão (2002)
América (2005)
O Profeta (2006)
Faça Sua História (2008)
A Favorita (2008)
Cama de Gato (2009)
Cordel Encantado (2011)
Avenida Brasil (2012)
Joia Rara (2013)
A Regra do Jogo (2015)

References

External links 

Brazilian actresses
People from Niterói
Living people
1967 births